Godspeed (August Heart) is a fictional character appearing in American comic books published by DC Comics. He was established as a detective and one of Barry Allen's best friends on the police force. When his brother is murdered and the man he suspects is exonerated, he becomes vengeful and eventually gains speed-based superpowers. Donning the identity of Godspeed, he becomes a vigilante bent on killing criminals instead of incarcerating them, serving as an antithesis to the Flash. He has been portrayed as both a supervillain and an antihero in the comic books and adapted media since his introduction in 2016.

The character made his live-action debut in The Flash, voiced by BD Wong in seasons five and six and portrayed by Karan Oberoi in season seven.

Fictional character biography
Godspeed first makes an appearance during one of Barry Allen's visions, claiming he would kill them all.

August Heart is a colleague of Barry Allen from the Central City Police Department. Heart's brother was murdered by a career criminal and his killer was let free due to the evidence being destroyed when Barry and his lab were struck by lightning. When August confronts the Black Hole, a group who had stolen a van containing equipment from S.T.A.R. Labs, he recognizes their symbol as the same one spray-painted near his brother's crime scene. August is shot at but before the bullet could hit him or Barry could save him, August is struck by lightning from a Speed Force storm. Now a speedster, August knocks out his shooter. After Barry reveals himself to be the Flash, August creates his own costume and becomes Barry's partner, also wishing to use his powers to solve his brother's murder. After defeating Black Hole, they witness another Speed Force storm strike more citizens, turning them into speedsters. August helps Barry round up any new speedsters who use their newfound powers as criminals. The two meet Dr. Meena Dhawan, a new speedster who has helped create a Speed Force training center to help the new speedsters control their powers. When Barry and Meena return after recruiting more speedsters, they find an injured August who tells them that a new speedster called Godspeed killed the speedster criminals and took their speed. A recovered August brings two of the recruits with him in order to storm the Speed Force storm-infused Dr. Carver. After Barry and Meena's 'day off', Godspeed arrives at the training center where he is confronted by Meena. As Avery Ho, one of the speedster recruits, escapes to get the Flash, Godspeed kills Meena and two of the recruits and takes their speed.

When Godspeed kills Billy Parks, the main suspect in August's brother's murder, Barry realizes that August is Godspeed. Barry confronts him and August reveals that he is indeed Godspeed and had given up on the justice system, deciding to become judge, jury and executioner, killing his brother's murderer. August reveals that when he was near the speedster criminals, he could feel the Speed Force within them connecting with him. He decided to take their powers from them, resulting in their deaths and August being injured. After realizing that it was possible to siphon another speedster's speed without killing them (evident when he, Barry, Meena and two recruits took Dr. Carver's speed), August tried it again on Meena and the two recruits. However, it had the same results as the first time. With his increased speed, August Heart reveals he can create a double of himself and be at two places at once, though it takes a physical toll on him. Barry uses this to his advantage and escapes. August proceeds to interrogate the other Black Hole members about his brother's death, but kills them all when he receives no information. When the speedster recruits safely give their speed to Barry and Wally to stop Godspeed, August arrives and is able to take Avery's speed. Barry chases after Godspeed who reveals that he will head to Iron Heights and do the one thing Barry could not, kill his enemies, including Eobard Thawne. However, the new Kid Flash (Wally West II) intervenes and helps the Flash in taking down Godspeed, who is later incarcerated in Iron Heights. It is not known whether August still maintains a connection to the Speed Force, as it was hinted that all who were hit during the Speed Force storm's powers may be temporary.

August later teams up with the Flash and his nemesis Eobard Thawne to stop the villain Paradox from erasing all of Flash's history. After Paradox is defeated, August asks Thawne if, given the latter's extensive future knowledge of the Flash, he knows who killed August's brother. Thawne gleefully admits that it was Thawne himself and snaps August's neck, killing him.

Powers and abilities
In addition to abilities shared with other speedsters, Godspeed has the ability to forcibly take another speedster's speed. This is done by running around a speedster (or speedsters) at extreme speed, resulting in Godspeed gaining their speed, but at the cost of injuring himself and killing any victim or victims not willing to give up their speed. However, Godspeed was able to take Avery's speed without killing her, and Barry and Wally were able to take the speed from several speedsters safely.

Godspeed also has the ability to create a clone of himself by dividing the Speed Force in him.  However, extended use of this clone will result in intense pain, and the copy will then destabilize, with its portion of the Speed Force returning to the original Godspeed. Like other speedsters, Godspeed can run up to 10 times the speed of light by entering the Speed Force.

In other media
August Heart / Godspeed appears in The Flash live-action television series, portrayed by Kindall Charters in season five and Karan Oberoi in season seven, with BD Wong providing his disguised voice. Introduced in his self-titled season five episode, this version is a Mercury Labs intern from the year 2049 who uses science to imbue himself with powers after replicating tachyon technology and Zoom's Velocity drug. He becomes a costumed thief and murderer to raid chemical facilities in order to make his powers permanent, only to be defeated by Nora West-Allen and incarcerated. In season seven, Godspeed is the arch-nemesis of Bart Allen. Due to a "Godspeed War" taking place and after locating Godspeed in the present, Barry Allen / Flash uses a neural hypercollider to enter his mind and uncover the war's origins. Godspeed desires "organic speed" from the Speed Force, imbued with its energy by Barry. Godspeed attempts to become a god, only to be defeated by the younger Flash and Eobard Thawne / Reverse-Flash and incarcerated at Iron Heights Penitentiary with his memory removed.
 Additionally, multiple drones of Godspeed appear in seasons six and seven as a result of the Godspeed War with one portrayed by Ryan Handley and most drones voiced by Rick D. Wasserman. Team Flash captures several of them and learn that their master, later revealed to be the "prime" Godspeed, desires "infinite velocity". The drones attack the Speed Force for its energy and kidnap Jay Garrick / Flash in an attempt to lure out Bart until Team Flash rescue the elder Flash and Godspeed withdraws them.

References

Comics characters introduced in 2016
DC Comics metahumans
DC Comics characters who can move at superhuman speeds
DC Comics characters with accelerated healing
Fictional mass murderers
Central City Police Department officers
Fictional characters who can duplicate themselves
Fictional characters who can manipulate time
Fictional characters with electric or magnetic abilities
Fictional characters who can manipulate sound
Fictional characters who can turn invisible
Fictional characters who can turn intangible
Fictional characters with air or wind abilities 
Fictional characters with absorption or parasitic abilities
Fictional characters with superhuman senses
Fictional characters with density control abilities
DC Comics male supervillains
Vigilante characters in comics